The Asian Football Hall of Fame is a hall of fame for Asian professional footballers maintained by Asian Football Confederation. AFC officially created it for 60th anniversary of its foundation on 30 November 2014.

Inductees
A total of 10 players were inaugural inductees in 2014.
 Inductees are listed according to the date of their induction and then sorted according to last name alphabetically.
Table headers
 Nationality – The country/countries that the inductee played for are shown.
 Professional Career – The years of the player's first and last appearance for a professional club/national team.
 AFC Individual Achievements – Other individual achievements awarded by Asian Football Confederation.

Source:

Source:

Inductees By Country

Ceremony
Source:

References

Association football museums and halls of fame
Asian Football Confederation
Footballer
Awards established in 2014
Halls of fame in Malaysia